H.M. Prison Northeye was a prison located at Bexhill-on-Sea, East Sussex, England which was in operation from 1969 to 1992.

The prison was formerly the site of a Royal Air Force Mobile Radio Unit which housed reserve equipment for the Chain Home radar station at Pevensey. It subsequently became a radar station itself, but was decommissioned in 1964. It was subsequently opened as a Category C training prison in January 1969.

Prison disturbances
It was one of the prisons which participated in the prison strike organised by Preservation of the Rights of Prisoners in 1972.

In 1986 40% of the prison was destroyed when 60 of the 450 inmates rioted in response to being locked in their cells for 23 hours a day during a Prison Officers overtime ban.

References

Men's prisons
Category C prisons in England
Defunct prisons in England